Øyvind Vennerød (22 July 1919 – 27 September 1991) was a Norwegian film director and producer. He was born in Kristiania, and was the father of Petter Vennerød.

Filmography
1959: Støv på hjernen
1960: Millionær for en aften
1961: Sønner av Norge
1964: Alle tiders kupp
1969: Himmel og helvete

References

1919 births
1991 deaths
Film people from Oslo
Norwegian film directors
Norwegian film producers